Edward Eugene Rains (born December 24, 1956) is an American former basketball player.  He played for the San Antonio Spurs of the National Basketball Association (NBA). Rains played college basketball for the South Alabama Jaguars.

College
Rains played college basketball for the University of South Alabama from 1977 to 1981.  In his college career, he scored 1,801 points (15.7 per game) and in his senior season was named the Sun Belt Conference Player of the Year.

Professional career
After the close of his college career, Rains was drafted by the San Antonio Spurs of the NBA in the second round of the 1981 NBA draft (30th pick overall).  He appeared in 83 games for the Spurs over two seasons, averaging 3.5 points per game.  He was the first player from South Alabama to appear in an NBA game.

References

1956 births
Living people
American men's basketball players
Basketball players from Florida
San Antonio Spurs draft picks
San Antonio Spurs players
Small forwards
South Alabama Jaguars men's basketball players
Sportspeople from Ocala, Florida